The Academic Law Institute (translit: Akademichiskii Pravovoi Institut, API) is a private law school founded in 1993 under the auspices of the Institute of State and Law of the Russian Academy of Sciences.  The ALU teaching staff is composed of Institute of State and Law fellows and legal academics within the Russian Academy of Sciences.

In 2010, the Academic Law University was renamed from the Academic Law University (АПУ) to better reflect the specialized scope of study at the institution.

Notable alumni

Sergey Aleksandrovich Volkov, Russian cosmonaut and son of Soviet cosmonaut.
William E. Butler, LL.M. (1997), the foremost Western scholar on Russian law.

References

Institutes of the Russian Academy of Sciences
Universities in Moscow
Law schools in Russia
Educational institutions established in 1993
1993 establishments in Russia